Derby Rowing Club is a rowing club on the River Derwent, based at Darley Grove, Darley Abbey, Derby, Derbyshire.

The History
Derby Rowing Club was founded by a few friends who wanted to row. They worked for the train network and met in a pub by St. Mary's bridge each week before deciding that they wanted to start rowing. Initially, they rented some land by the river from the rail company and made a small boathouse (which was called the shed). Over time expansion was needed and one cold winter when the river froze, the clubhouse was moved across to the other side of the river, where it is located today. Throughout the years, many improvements have been made, the latest of which is the addition of an extension which is now our erg room and many boats have been added to our fleet. Our members have competed at the highest levels with members racing in the Boat Race, World Championships and at Henley Royal Regatta.

The Club
DRC consists of four core squads; men's, women's, junior's and masters.

All squads are composed of active members who train regularly and go away to race for the club at various events whether that be Henley Royal Regatta, Henley Women's Regatta or some smaller provincial regattas such as Peterborough Summer Regatta. Our squads also cater for members who are perfectly happy to come down to the club on a Saturday or Sunday afternoon to go and have a paddle with their friends.

University of Derby Rowing Club
The University of Derby Rowing Club is affiliated to Derby Rowing Club.

Honours

Henley Royal Regatta

Henley Women's Regatta

University Boat Race

British Senior, Masters and Junior Champions

European and World Championships

Club Committee

References

Sport in Derby
Rowing clubs in England